This is a list of 102 species in the genus Hyperaspis.

Hyperaspis species

References

Coccinellidae